Mo'in Encyclopedic Dictionary  ( Farhang-e Mo'īn) is the second largest Persian language encyclopedic dictionary. It was collected and integrated by Mohammad Mo'in.

History
The Mo'in Encyclopedic Dictionary was collected during a 19-year period (1947-1966) under the administration of Mohammad Mo'in. After his death in 1971, the dictionary has been completed by Ja'far Shahidi.

Finally, it was published in 1972 by Amirkabir publications in Tehran, Iran, in six volumes – four volumes for Persian words and expressions, and two volumes for proper nouns.

The dictionary has not been updated since its first publishing, but has been reprinted many times.

References
Persian Wikipedia article

1972 non-fiction books
Persian encyclopedias
1972 in Iran
20th-century encyclopedias